Bandaragama Divisional Secretariat is a  Divisional Secretariat  of Kalutara District, of Western Province, Sri Lanka.

References
 Divisional Secretariats Portal

Divisional Secretariats of Kalutara District